Gabriel T. Harrower (September 25, 1816 in Guilford, Chenango County, New York – August 15, 1895 in Lawrenceville, Tioga County, Pennsylvania) was an American politician from New York.

Life
He was the son of Benjamin Harrower. The family removed to Lindley when Gabriel was still a child. He attended the common schools and Geneva Lyceum. Then he engaged in farming and the lumber business.

He joined the Free Soil Party in 1848, and the Republican Party upon its foundation. He was Sheriff of Steuben County from 1853 to 1855; and Supervisor of the Town of Lindley. On November 5, 1859, he married Helen Parkhurst (1837–1911), and they had several children.

During the American Civil War he commanded the 161st New York Volunteer Infantry Regiment, fighting in the Department of the Gulf, and taking part in the Siege of Port Hudson.

He was a member of the New York State Senate (27th D.) in 1872 and 1873. In 1872, he joined the Liberal Republican Party and supported Horace Greeley for President.

He was buried at the Cemetery in Lawrenceville, Pennsylvania.

References
 The New York Civil List compiled by Franklin Benjamin Hough, Stephen C. Hutchins and Edgar Albert Werner (1870; pg. 552)
 Life Sketches of Executive Officers and Members of the Legislature of the State of New York by William H. McElroy & Alexander McBride (1873; pg. 71f) [e-book]
 Obit transcribed from the Wellsboro Gazette of August 22, 1895

External links

1816 births
1895 deaths
New York (state) state senators
People from Guilford, New York
New York (state) Republicans
New York (state) Liberal Republicans
People from Steuben County, New York
People from Tioga County, Pennsylvania
Sheriffs of Steuben County, New York
Union Army officers
Town supervisors in New York (state)
New York (state) Democrats
Military personnel from Pennsylvania